Kablaky Futebol Clube, commonly known as Kablaky is an East Timorese football club based in Manufahi, Same District. The team plays in the Liga Futebol Amadora, playing in the Segunda Divisão since its inception in 2016. The club also includes a partnered futsal team that is set to compete in the Pra Liga Futsal Timor-Leste.

Squad (2020/2021)
Updated September 2020.

1. Mariano Matins (GK)
4. Domingos Pires
19. Cerilo Santos
2. Martinho Costa
3. Carolino Correia
14. Fretelino Santos
17. Silvestre Castro
6. Justino Deus
11. José Costa
9. Kevin Fernandes
12. Teodoro Costa

20. Aldo Manise (GK)
7. Julinho Costa
16. Amandio Galucho
8. Matias Guterres
10. Joanico Noronha
13. Job Rego
18. Silvestre Gama
Head Coach. João Fernandes

Competition records

Liga Futebol Amadora
2016: 5th place in Group B Segunda Divisao
2017: 4th place in Group A Segunda Divisao
2018: 11th place in Segunda Divisao
2019: 2nd place in Group A Segunda Divisao

Taça 12 de Novembro
2016: 2nd Round
2018: 1/8 Finals
2019: 1/8 Finals

Copa FFTL 

 2020: 4th in Group D

References

External links 

 Facebook page: https://www.facebook.com/kablakifc
Old Facebook page: https://www.facebook.com/kablakista

Football clubs in East Timor
Football